The Democratic group, MoDem and Independents, formerly known as the Democratic Movement (MoDem) and affiliated democrats, is a parliamentary group in the National Assembly including representatives of the Democratic Movement (MoDem) after the 2017 legislative elections.

History 

After the rallying of MoDem president François Bayrou to the candidacy of Emmanuel Macron, the party was reserved dozens of constituencies in the subsequent legislative elections, hoping to secure at least 15 deputies, the number required to form a parliamentary group. The party ultimately won 42 seats in the National Assembly.

On 25 June, Marc Fesneau was unanimously elected president of the MoDem group by its 42 members.

At the time of its formation on 27 June, the parliamentary group had 47 deputies, including 4 associated members.

List of presidents

Historical membership

See also 

Centrist Union group

References

External links 
 Notices and portraits of deputies 
 Changes in the composition of groups 

National Assembly (France)
Parliamentary groups in France